An injection molding machine (also spelled as injection moulding machine in BrE), also known as an injection press, is a machine for manufacturing plastic products by the injection molding process. It consists of two main parts, an injection unit and a clamping unit.

Operation
Injection molding machine molds can be fastened in either a horizontal or vertical position. Most machines are horizontally oriented, but vertical machines are used in some niche applications such as insert molding, allowing the machine to take advantage of gravity. Some vertical machines also do not require the mold to be fastened. There are many ways to fasten the tools to the platens, the most common are manual clamps (both halves are bolted to the platens); however, hydraulic clamps (chocks are used to hold the tool in place) and magnetic clamps are also used. The magnetic and hydraulic clamps are used where fast tool changes are required.

The person designing the mold chooses whether the mold uses a cold runner system or a hot runner system to carry the plastic and fillers from the injection unit to the cavities.
A cold runner is a simple channel carved into the mold.
The plastic that fills the cold runner cools as the part cools and is then ejected with the part as a sprue.
A hot runner system is more complicated, often using cartridge heaters to keep the plastic in the runners hot as the part cools.
After the part is ejected, the plastic remaining in a hot runner is injected into the next part.

Types of injection molding machines
Machines are classified primarily by the type of driving systems they use: hydraulic, mechanical, electrical, or hybrid

Hydraulic
Hydraulic machines have historically been the only option available to molders until Nissei Plastic Industrial introduced the first all-electric injection molding machine in 1983.  Hydraulic machines, although not nearly as precise, are the predominant type in most of the world, with the exception of Japan.

Mechanical
Mechanical type machines use the toggle system for building up tonnage on the clamps of the machine. Tonnage is required on all machines so that the clamps of the machine do not open due to the injection pressure. If the mold partially opens up, it will create flashing in the plastic product.

Electric
The electric press, also known as Electric Machine Technology (EMT), reduces operation costs by cutting energy consumption and also addresses some of the environmental concerns surrounding the hydraulic press.  Electric presses have been shown to be quieter, faster, and have a higher accuracy, however the machines are more expensive.

Hybrid injection (sometimes referred to as "Servo-Hydraulic") molding machines claim to take advantage of the best features of both hydraulic and electric systems, but in actuality use almost the same amount of electricity to operate as an electric injection molding machine depending on the manufacturer.

A robotic arm is often used to remove the molded components; either by side or top entry, but it is more common for parts to drop out of the mold, through a chute and into a container.

Main components of injection molding machine

Injection unit
Consists of three main components:

 Screw motor drive
 Reciprocating screw and barrel
 Heaters, Thermocouple, Ring plunger

Clamping unit
Consists of three main components:

 Mold
 Clamping motor drive
 Tie bars, the sender is clamped into the edge of a workbench

References

Further reading
Bryce, Douglas M. Plastic Injection Molding: Manufacturing Process Fundamentals. SME, 1996.
Brydson, J, Plastics Materials, Butterworths 9th Ed (1999).
Callister, William D, Materials Science and Engineering: An Introduction, John Wiley and Sons
Lewis, Peter Rhys, Reynolds, K, Gagg, C, Forensic Materials Engineering: Case studies, CRC Press (2004).
Osswald, Tim, Lih-Sheng Turng, Paul J.Gramann. Injection Molding Handbook 2nd Ed. Hanser Verlag, 2007
Osswald, E. Schmachtenberg and E. Baur, ”International Plastics Handbook”, Hanser Verlag, (2006). 
Rosato, Donald V; Marlene G. Rosato. Concise Encyclopedia of Plastics. Springer, 2000.
Rosato, Dominick; Rosato Marlene, and Rosato Donald  Injection Molding Handbook 3rd Ed.  Kluwer Academic Publishers, 2000.
Todd, Robert H; Dell K. Allen and Leo Alting Manufacturing Processes Reference Guide.  Industrial Press Inc., 1994. pgs. 240–245
Whelan, Tony. Polymer Technology Dictionary Springer, 1994.

Molding processes
Packaging machinery